The following is a list of notable events in American television in 2020.

January

February

March

April

May

June

July

August

September

October

November

December

See also
2020 deaths in American television

References

2020 in American television